Bognor Regis Pier is a pier located in the seaside resort of Bognor Regis, West Sussex. The pier opened on 5 May 1865 to the design of Sir Charles Fox and J. W. Wilson. Initially constructed with a length of 1000 ft (305m), it now stands at 350 ft (107m). The pier is Grade II listed.

The pier continued to be developed after opening. A small bandstand was added in 1880, followed by a seaward end pavilion which opened on July 9, 1900. A small landing stage was added in 1903, to allow paddle steamers to dock.

During World War II the pier became a Royal Navy observation station, named HMS St Barbara.

Storm damage in 1964 and 1965 caused the pavilion to sink into the sea. The following decade, after two fires in three months, the pier was closed in December 1974.

In 1989, Bognor Regis Pier was awarded a Grade II listing status by English Heritage. Despite this, the condition of the pier continued to decline, and in 1994 an application was made to demolish the structure's remaining seaward end.

The International Bognor Birdman is an annual competition for human-powered 'flying' machines held each summer in Bognor Regis. Contestants launch themselves from the end of the pier, a prize being awarded to the one who glides the furthest distance. Rarely taken completely seriously, the event provides competitors with an opportunity to construct improbable machines complete with outlandish dress. The spectacle draws a sizeable crowd in addition to the local media. Inaugurated in nearby Selsey in 1971, the Birdman transferred to Bognor in 1978 when it had outgrown its original location. Competitors have included Richard Branson.

The Birdman Event of 2008 was transferred to Worthing after  of pier had been removed by the owners due to storm damage in March 2008. This meant that there were question marks over the possible safety of the contestants landing in shallower water. The shortened pier was judged safe for the event in 2010, and the event subsequently returned to Bognor. There are now annual events at both Bognor and Worthing.

References

Piers in Sussex
Buildings and structures in Sussex
Tourist attractions in West Sussex